The 2013 European Figure Skating Championships was a senior international figure skating competition in the 2012–13 season. The competition was held from 23 to 27 January 2013 at the Dom Sportova in Zagreb, Croatia. Medals were awarded in the disciplines of men's singles, ladies' singles, pair skating, and ice dancing.

Qualification
Skaters were eligible for the event if they were representing a European member nation of the International Skating Union and had reached the age of 15 before July 1, 2012 in their place of birth. The corresponding competition for non-European skaters was the 2013 Four Continents Championships. National associations selected their entries according to their own criteria but the ISU mandated that their selections achieve a minimum technical elements score (TES) at an international event prior to the European Championships.

Minimum TES

Number of entries per discipline
Based on the results of the 2012 European Championships, the ISU allowed each country one to three entries per discipline.

Entries
Entries submitted by member states:

Schedule
 Wednesday, January 23
 11:45–16:00 – Short dance
 18:00–18:20 – Opening ceremony
 18:45–21:15 – Pairs' short
 Thursday, January 24
 11:45–16:10 – Men's short
 19:00–22:00 – Pairs' free
 Friday, January 25
 10:45–15:55 – Ladies' short
 18:30–21:50 – Free dance
 Saturday, January 26
 12:45–16:50 – Men's free
 18:00–21:55 – Ladies' free
 Sunday, January 27
 15:00–17:00 – Exhibitions

Overview
2012 European ladies' silver medalist Kiira Korpi of Finland withdrew due to inflammation of her left Achilles tendon and was replaced by Alisa Mikonsaari. The defending ice dancing champions, France's Nathalie Péchalat / Fabian Bourzat, withdrew due to a partial tear of Bourzat's adductor muscle. France did not have a substitute. The 2012 pair skating silver medalists, Vera Bazarova / Yuri Larionov of Russia, withdrew due to Larionov's wrist injury and Ksenia Stolbova / Fedor Klimov were named as their replacements. Poor weather delayed some arrivals. Germany's Aliona Savchenko / Robin Szolkowy's flight was cancelled twice. A group of Russian skaters flying to Zagreb were stuck in Budapest, Hungary for ten hours due to weather and organizational problems.

France's Florent Amodio was first in the men's short program, one point ahead of Spain's Javier Fernández, while France's Brian Joubert finished third. Seven-time European champion Evgeni Plushenko withdrew after the short program due to aggravation of his back problem. Fernández placed first in the free skate, with Michal Březina of the Czech Republic in second and Amodio in third. Fernández finished first overall and won Spain's first ever European title in figure skating, silver went to Amodio, while Březina claimed the bronze medal and the first European podium of his career.

Russia's Adelina Sotnikova placed first in the ladies' short program, with Italy's Carolina Kostner and Valentina Marchei in second and third respectively. Elizaveta Tuktamysheva of Russia won the free skate ahead of Kostner and Sotnikova. Kostner finished first in the overall standings and won her fifth European title while Sotnikova and Tuktamysheva took their first continental medals, silver and bronze respectively.

Tatiana Volosozhar / Maxim Trankov of Russia won the pairs' short program ahead of Germany's Aliona Savchenko / Robin Szolkowy and Italy's Stefania Berton / Ondrej Hotarek. The top three maintained their respective positions in the free skate. Volosozhar / Trankov repeated as European champions, while Savchenko / Szolkowy took silver and Berton / Hotarek took the bronze, Italy's first European medal in pair skating.

Russia's Ekaterina Bobrova / Dmitri Soloviev placed first in the short dance, with teammates Elena Ilinykh / Nikita Katsalapov and Italy's Anna Cappellini / Luca Lanotte rounding out the top three. Bobrova / Soloviev won their first European title, silver medalists Ilinykh / Katsalapov were first in the free dance by 0.33 and second overall by 0.11, and bronze medalists Cappellini / Lanotte finished on the European podium for the first time in their career.

Results

Men

Ladies

Pairs

Ice dancing

Medals summary

Medals by country
Table of medals for overall placement:

Table of small medals for placement in the short segment:

Table of small medals for placement in the free segment:

Medalists
Medals for overall placement:

Small medals for placement in the short segment:

Small medals for placement in the free segment:

References

External links
 Starting orders and result details
 Entries
 International Skating Union
 Behind the scenes shots of the Championship

European Figure Skating Championships
European
European Figure Skating Championships
Sports competitions in Zagreb
International figure skating competitions hosted by Croatia
European Figure Skating
2010s in Zagreb